Chief Colorow's Cave' other wise known as “Willowbrook Amphitheater,” is a cave-like structure composed of Paleozoic Age Fountain Formation sandstone.  The top is open to the sky.  Willowbrook Amphitheatre is located in the Willowbrook subdivision in Jefferson County, near Morrison, Colorado, south of Red Rocks Park and Red Rocks Amphitheatre. It is located on private land, and is restricted to the use of the association residents for weddings and local events.

Colorow's Cafe was named for Chief Colorow who is said to have used the cave along with his band for temporary shelter during his summer visits.

References

Landmarks in Colorado
Rock formations of Colorado
Fountain Formation
Geography of Jefferson County, Colorado
Landforms of Jefferson County, Colorado
Amphitheaters in the United States